General Nisbet Balfour (1743, Dunbog10 October 1823, Dunbog) was a British soldier in the American Revolutionary War and later a Scottish Member of Parliament (MP) in the British Parliament.

He was born in Dunbog, in the county of Fife, Scotland in 1743. Joining the 4th Regiment of Foot as ensign in 1761, he rose to become one of Cornwallis' most trusted officers during the American Revolution.  He fought and was severely injured in the Battle of Bunker Hill (Breed's Hill) and also participated in battles in Elizabethtown, Brandywine, and Germantown, and was made Lieutenant-Colonel (of the 23rd Regiment of Foot) in 1778. He accompanied Cornwallis to Charleston where he was sometimes commandant. He was promoted to Major General in 1793, Colonel of both the 93rd Foot (1793) (an earlier regiment than the Sutherland Highlanders raised in 1799) and the 39th Foot in 1794 and served in the war with France.

He was elected to Parliament in 1790 as the MP for Wigtown Burghs, sitting until 1796 and again in 1797 for Arundel, sitting until 1802.

He died in October 1823 in Dunbog, Scotland.

Family
Descendants and kin include the Stewarts of St Fort, Fife, Scotland, as well as John Stewart of Urrard, son of Robert Stewart of Fincastle and the Athol Stewarts. Elizabeth Mure of Rowallan. Reference is made in the 1842, 1853, and 1863 editions of Sir Bernard Burke's A Genalogical and Heraldic Dictionary of the Landed Gentry of Great Britain, Volume 2.  In the 1863 edition on page 1437 mentions one William Campbell and states that he assumed the additional surnames of Stewart and Balfour to conform with the terms of the will of his maternal uncle, Lieut. General Nisbet Balfour.

References

Search current Google Books for Nisbet Balfour
South Carolina and the American Revolution: a battlefield history - by John W. Gordon, pages 163 & 226
 

|-

1743 births
1823 deaths
People from Fife
Members of the Parliament of Great Britain for Scottish constituencies
British MPs 1790–1796
Members of the Parliament of Great Britain for English constituencies
British MPs 1796–1800
Members of the Parliament of the United Kingdom for English constituencies
UK MPs 1801–1802
British Army generals
British Army personnel of the American Revolutionary War
King's Own Royal Regiment officers
39th Regiment of Foot officers
British Army personnel of the French Revolutionary Wars
Royal Welch Fusiliers officers